Noketchee Creek is a stream in the U.S. state of Georgia. It is a tributary to Sandy Creek.

Noketchee is a fake Native American name, i.e. no fish are to be caught there.

References

Rivers of Georgia (U.S. state)
Rivers of Clarke County, Georgia
Rivers of Madison County, Georgia